King Nyumbabo Mayitjha II Cornelius III Mahlangu (2 June 1947 – 30 June 2005) was the king of the Ndzundza Nation (Southern Ndebele) in Mpumalanga, South Africa

HM Ingwenyama MAYITJHA II [Nyumbabo Cornelius III Mahlangu] ruled from the year 1992 until the year 2005. His father was Ingwenyama Mabusabesala II [David Mabhoko II Mahlangu], his grandfather was Ingwenyama Mayitjha I [Cornelius II Mahlangu]. They are the descendants of the great King of the Ndzundza Ndebele, Ingwenyama uMabhoko ka Magodongo. 

He married for the first time in 1975, wedding Princess Siphila Dlamini of Swaziland, after which he married Princess Lena Masilela, Princess Nomsa Sanny-flora Mtsweni, Princess Gabisile Elizabeth Mabona, Princess Nomsa Daphane Mdaka and Princess Lizzy Pumzile Mabona (cousin of the fourth wife). He had 20 children from these marriages, as well as other children from five informal liaisons.

References

1947 births
2005 deaths
People from Mpumalanga
Southern Ndebele people
African kings